The 2010–11 Japan Figure Skating Championships was the 79th edition of the event. It took place between December 24 and 27, 2010 at the Big Hat arena in Nagano. Skaters competed in the disciplines of men's singles, ladies' singles, pair skating, and ice dancing on the senior level for the title of national champion of Japan.

Results

Men

Ladies

Pairs

Ice dancing

External links
 2010–11 Japan Figure Skating Championships results

2010
2010 in figure skating
2011 in figure skating
Figure Skating Championships 2010-11
Figure Skating Championships 2010-11